Hiroshi Inoue or Inoue Hiroshi may refer to: 
 Hiroshi Inoue (entomologist)  (1917–2008), Japanese lepidopterist
 Hiroshi Inoue (bryologist)  (1932–1989), Japanese botanist